The Jardin botanique de la Roche Fauconnière is a private botanical garden located in the Parc de la Fauconnière, Cherbourg-Octeville, Manche, Normandy, France. The garden was created in 1870 or 1873 by Alfred Favier and maintained by subsequent family members Léon Favier and Dr. Charles Favier. Today it contains 3,400 taxa, many from the Southern Hemisphere, with eucalyptus, magnolia, and unusual specimens including Ilex nothofagifolia and Pseudopanax laetevirens. It is open by appointment only.

See also 
 List of botanical gardens in France

References 
 Patrimoine de France entry (French)
 HortiAuray entry (French), with photographs
 Guide Sentier Pietons : Cherbourg, pages 43–44.
 Convention on Biological Diversity: French Botanical Gardens
 French Wikipedia article for Cherbourg-Octeville :fr:Octeville#cite note-troisjardins-55, accessed January 14, 2009
 Plantes et Jardins entry (French)
 "Visite de la propriété de M. Favier à la Fauconnière", Bulletin de la Société d'horticulture de Cherbourg, XLVIII, pages 33–39, 1916.

Gardens in Manche
Botanical gardens in France